Paraense may refer to:

 A person or thing from the state of Pará, in northern Brazil
 Guilherme Paraense, a Brazilian sport shooter
 Paraense Transportes Aéreos, a Brazilian airline